This list includes any types which had 10 or more aircraft built or types which are important to glider development. All the gliders in this list can be found in the J2MCL web site with individual pages for each type. This list does not include Motor glider types. 
(N.B. Some specifications are quoted with the wrong units!!)

See also

Flight
Gliding flight
List of gliders
Unpowered aircraft

Sources

Comprehensive Glider Database j2mcl-planeurs 
Glider polar data
Sailplane Directory

External links

!
Lists of glider aircraft